Richard Hymns (born 18 July 1947) is an English sound editor. He won three Academy Awards for his work on Indiana Jones and the Last Crusade, Jurassic Park and Saving Private Ryan. He was also nominated for nine more in the category Best Sound Editing, including one for the 1999 film Fight Club.

On 24 January 2012 he was nominated for an Academy Award for the film War Horse.

References

External links
 https://web.archive.org/web/20090208011732/http://awardsdatabase.oscars.org/ampas_awards/BasicSearchInput.jsp
 

1947 births
Living people
Sound editors
Place of birth missing (living people)
Best Sound Editing Academy Award winners
Best Sound BAFTA Award winners